Waltershausen Glacier is one of the major glaciers in Greenland. 
It has its terminus on the east coast of the Greenland ice sheet.

History
This glacier was named after German geologist Wolfgang Sartorius von Waltershausen by the Second German North Polar Expedition led by Carl Koldewey that first surveyed and partially explored the Kaiser Franz Joseph Fjord in 1869–70.

Geography
The Waltershausen Glacier flows from the NW between Strindberg Land to the south and west, and Ole Romer Land to the northeast. Its terminus is at the head of the Nordfjord, a branch of the Kaiser Franz Joseph Fjord, one of the largest fjords in East Greenland. Hudson Land is located east of the terminus area. 

The Waltershausen Nunatak is a large nunatak in the upper section of the glacier and Bartholin Land is a land area on the northern side.

See also
List of glaciers in Greenland

References

External links

A journey to East Greenland's 11 km wide Waltershausen Glacier front.
Glaciers Not On Simple, Upward Trend Of Melting sciencedaily.com, Feb. 21, 2007 "Two of Greenland's largest glaciers (Kangerdlugssuaq and Helheim) shrank dramatically ... between 2004 and 2005. And then, less than two years later, they returned to near their previous rates of discharge.

Glaciers of Greenland

ceb:Waltershausen Gletscher
sv:Waltershausen Gletscher